Lepanto was a  of the Spanish Republican Navy. She took part in the Spanish Civil War on the side of the government of the Second Spanish Republic. She was named after the Battle of Lepanto.

Civil War 

Lepanto saw a lot of action during the Spanish Civil War. At the start of the hostilities she was involved in the blockade of the Gibraltar Strait to prevent the rebel transport of troops from Spanish Morocco to southern Spain. In the course of these operations she was damaged by rebel aircraft on 5 August 1936, a couple of hours before the convoy known as Convoy de la victoria successfully broke the Republican blockade. In September she joined the squadron which sailed to the Bay of Biscay in support of Republican forces isolated on the northern front. For most of 1937 the destroyer was on convoy duty. While involved in one of these missions, Lepanto took part of the Battle of Cape Cherchell.

Since Lepanto was likely responsible for the fatal hit in the forward magazine that sank the opposing cruiser, she was awarded the Distintivo de Madrid along with other loyalist vessels.

On 5 March 1939, their crews hoping to avoid execution, Lepanto fled Cartagena with the Republican squadron bound for Bizerte, Tunisia, arriving on 11 March. The next day, Commander of the Fleet Miguel Buiza asked for political asylum and the ships were requisitioned by the French authorities and left in the custody by a few crewmen, the rest being held in a prison camp at Meheri Zabbens. Later the rebel transports Mallorca and Marqués de Comillas arrived 31 March 1939 with new crews to take over the ships.

Post war

On 2 April 1939, just 24 hours after official end of the Civil War, Lepanto and her sister ships which had fought for the Republic sailed back to Spain with new Nationalist crews. They arrived in Cadiz on 5 April.

Unable to change course in time, she ran down the submarine, hitting her broadside between her conning tower and deck gun, cutting C4 in two. All 44 of her crew were lost with her.

Lepanto was decommissioned 24 May 1957 and scrapped in 1958.

Notes

References

External links 
 Destroyers in Spanish civil war 
 Battle of Cape Palos 
 C4 accident 

 

Churruca-class destroyers
Ships built in Cartagena, Spain
1929 ships
Spanish Republican Navy
Maritime incidents in July 1940
Military units and formations of the Spanish Civil War